Ogou Edmond Akichi (born 24 April 1990) is an Ivorian professional footballer who plays as a midfielder for Swiss club Lausanne Ouchy.

Club career
Akichi made his professional with Paris FC in a 0–0 Ligue 2 tie with Clermont Foot on 28 July 2017.

International career
Akichi is a youth international for Ivory Coast, representing them at the 2010 and 2011 Toulon Tournaments. He helped the team win the 2010 Toulon Tournament, and he made three appearances at the 2011 tournament.

Akichi also represented Ivory Coast at the 2011 African Nations Championship, making two appearances.

References

External links
 
 
 

1990 births
Living people
Footballers from Abidjan
Association football midfielders
Ivorian footballers
Ivory Coast under-20 international footballers
Academie de Foot Amadou Diallo players
AJ Auxerre players
US Roye-Noyon players
AC Amiens players
AS Béziers (2007) players
Paris FC players
AS Nancy Lorraine players
FC Stade Lausanne Ouchy players
Championnat National 2 players
Championnat National players
Ligue 2 players
Ivorian expatriate footballers
Ivorian expatriate sportspeople in France
Expatriate footballers in France
Ivorian expatriate sportspeople in Switzerland
Expatriate footballers in Switzerland
Ivory Coast A' international footballers
2011 African Nations Championship players